Joseph-Georges Francoeur (October 7, 1889 – July 19, 1956) was a Canadian provincial politician.

Born in Lévis, Quebec, Francoeur was the member of the Legislative Assembly of Quebec for Lévis from 1939 to 1944.

References

1889 births
1956 deaths
People from Lévis, Quebec
Quebec Liberal Party MNAs
French Quebecers